The Harold Hill Independent Party is a British minor political party formed in 2017 and dissolved in 2018. However was reinstated in 2018 and it returned a candidate at the 2018 Havering London Borough Council election. It is named for the London suburb of Harold Hill.

Elected representatives

Havering London Borough Council

Cllr Jan Sargent sat with the Independent Residents Group.

Electoral performance

Havering London Borough Council

References

Locally based political parties in England
Politics of the London Borough of Havering